Lucifuge may refer to:

Lucifuge Rofocale - head of government in Hell, appointed by Lucifer according to believers
Danzig II: Lucifuge - Danzig's second album